Arantangi is a constituency in the Tamil Nadu legislative assembly, that includes the city, Aranthangi in Pudukkottai district. It is a part of the Ramanathapuram Lok Sabha constituency. It is one of the 234 State Legislative Assembly Constituencies in Tamil Nadu, in India.

Madras State

Tamil Nadu 

 S. Thirunavukkarasu, gave his seat up to his mentor Anbarasan, who defeated Raja Paramasivam of All India Anna Dravida Munnetra Kazhagam. S. Thirunavukkarasu resigned to be an MP for Pudukkottai Lok Sabha constituency
Anbarasan died in July 2000 leaving the seat vacant, next election was held in the next general election.

Election Results

2021

2016

2011

2006

2001

1996

1991

1989

1984

1980

1977

1971

1967

1962

1957

1952

Footnotes

References 

 

Assembly constituencies of Tamil Nadu
Pudukkottai district